Cape Boggs is a bold, ice-covered headland in Antarctica. The headland marks the east extremity of Eielson Peninsula, on the east coast of Palmer Land, separating Black Coast and Wilkins Coast. It was discovered by members of East Base of the United States Antarctic Service (USAS) who charted this coast by land and from the air in 1940. It was named for Samuel Whittemore Boggs, geographer, Dept. of State, whose political and geographical studies of Antarctica were used by the USAS.

Headlands of Palmer Land